Far Mountain is the highest of over 13 peaks in the Ilgachuz Range in the Anahim Volcanic Belt in British Columbia, Canada. The Ilgachuz Range is one of the three major shield volcanoes that formed the Anahim Volcanic Belt when the North American Plate moved over a hotspot (the Anahim hotspot). This is similar to the one which feeds the Hawaiian Islands. The mountain is located in the western part of Itcha Ilgachuz Provincial Park.

See also
Ilgachuz Range
Rainbow Range
Itcha Range
Anahim hotspot
List of volcanoes in Canada
Anahim Volcanic Belt
Volcanism in Canada
Volcanism in Western Canada

References

Anahim Volcanic Belt
Two-thousanders of British Columbia
Landforms of the Chilcotin
Ilgachuz Range
Range 3 Coast Land District